61 Ursae Majoris, abbreviated 61 UMa, is a single star in the northern circumpolar constellation of Ursa Major. It has a yellow-orange hue and is dimly visible to the naked eye with an apparent visual magnitude of 5.35. The distance to this star is 31.2 light years based on parallax, and it is drifting closer with a radial velocity of −5.2 km/s. The star has a relatively high proper motion traversing the sky at the rate of  yr−1.

The stellar classification of 61 UMa is G8V, matching a late G-type main-sequence star. Since 1943, the spectrum of this star has served as one of the stable anchor points by which other stars are classified. It is considered a solar-type star, having physical properties that make it similar to the Sun. The star has 93% of the mass of the Sun and 86% of the Sun's radius. It is roughly two billion years old and is spinning with a projected rotational velocity of 3.3 km/s, for a period of 17.1 days. The metallicity, or abundance of elements with higher atomic number than helium, appears about the same as in the Sun. The star is radiating 61% of the luminosity of the Sun from its photosphere at an effective temperature of 5,488K.

During the 1950s, Karl Pilowski reported that photographic plates taken of the star appeared to show a variability of 0.2 in magnitude. Follow-up studies initially failed to confirm this variability, and it was found not to be an eclipsing binary based on radial velocity measurements. The star's photosphere is rotating differentially, and the rotation period, typically in the range of 16-18 days, shows a larger difference between different latitudes than for most other stars. It has an active chromosphere that exhibits strong and persistent starspot activity. A flare event was captured in 2013 while the star was being observed by the VATT, and the star has been detected as a source of X-ray emission.

No substellar companions have been observed in orbit around this star, and it appears to lack a dust ring as is found around some comparable stars. A radial velocity survey completed in 2020 has indicated that giant planetary companions are absent. A magnitude 11.35 stellar visual companion was reported by O. Struve in 1850.

In popular culture
In the science fiction of Larry Niven's Known Space universe, the homeworld of the major race the Kzinti is the third planet in orbit around 61 Ursae Majoris.

References

External links
 
 
 

G-type main-sequence stars
Ursae Majoris, 61

Ursa Major (constellation)
Durchmusterung objects
Ursae Majoris, 61
0434
101501
056997
4496